Sebastian Deffner is a German theoretical physicist and a professor in the Department of Physics at the University of Maryland, Baltimore County (UMBC). He is known for his contributions to the development of quantum thermodynamics with focus on the thermodynamics of quantum information, quantum speed limit for open systems, quantum control and shortcuts to adiabaticity.

Education 

Career 
From 2008 until 2011, Deffner was a research fellow at the University of Augsburg. From 2011 to 2014, he was a Research Associate in the group of Christopher Jarzynski at the University of Maryland, College Park (UMD) for which he had received the DAAD postdoctoral fellowship.
From 2014 to 2016, he took up the position of a Director’s Funded Postdoctoral Fellow with Wojciech H. Zurek at the Los Alamos National Laboratory.
Since 2016, he has held a position as a faculty member of the Department of Physics at the University of Maryland, Baltimore County (UMBC), where he leads the quantum thermodynamics group, and a position as a Visiting Professor at the University of Campinas in Brazil.

Honors and awards 
Deffner’s contributions to quantum thermodynamics have been recognized through the 2016 Early Career Award from the New Journal of Physics, as well as the Leon Heller Postdoctoral Publication Prize from the Los Alamos National Laboratory in 2016. Since 2017, Deffner has been a member of the international editorial board for IOP Publishing's Journal of Physics Communications, and since 2019 he has been on the editorial advisory board of the Journal of Non-Equilibrium Thermodynamics, and a member of the Section Board for Quantum Information of Entropy. He is also a member of the inaugural editorial board of PRX Quantum.

 2017 APS Outstanding Referee (American Physical Society).
 2016 Leon Heller Postdoctoral Publication Prize (Los Alamos National Laboratory).
 2016 Early Career Award (New Journal of Physics).

Personal life
Deffner is married to Catherine Nakalembe, a remote sensing scientist. They have 2 children.

See also 
 Shortcuts to adiabaticity

Books

References

External links 

 Quantum Thermodynamics at UMBC, led by Sebastian Deffner
 Sebastian Deffner at UMBC
 Sebastian Deffner at Publons
 Sebastian Deffner at arXiv

Theoretical physicists
Thermodynamicists
21st-century German physicists
Living people
1983 births
University of Maryland, Baltimore County faculty